Tazehabad-e Sadar (also Romanized as Tāzehābād-e Şadar; also known as Tāzehābād) is a village in Chapar Khaneh Rural District, Khomam District, Rasht County, Gilan Province, Iran. At the 2006 census, its population was 106, in 29 families.

References 

Populated places in Rasht County